Denmark is a Scandinavian country in Europe located on the 56th parallel north. Denmark is located at a zone where air masses from a diverse range of regions congregate, giving it its temperate climate. Denmark's average temperature is 7.7°C.

Highest temperatures ever recorded in Denmark

Lowest temperatures ever recorded in Denmark

Highest & lowest temperatures per year in Denmark 1990-2022

1990
 34.8 °C, 4 August, Tønder 
 -8.8°C, 6 December, Agerkrog 

1991
 27.6 °C, 12 July, Copenhagen 
 -21.4 °C, 9 February, Randers 

1992
 35.1 °C, 10 August, Klemensker 
 -14.2 °C, 30 December, Mariager 

1993
 28.8 °C, 10 June, Faaborg 
 -11.1 °C, 25 November, Vordingborg 

1994
 32.6 °C, 24 July, Blåvandshuk 
 -17.4 °C, 21 February, Frederikshavn 

1995
 31.8 °C, 10 July, Engelstrup 
 -16.8 °C, 30 December, Kås

1996
 32.7 °C, 21 August, Svaneke 
 -17.6 °C, 10 February, Skive 

1997
 32.9°C, 25 August, Åbenrå
 -20.8 °C, 2 January, Aalborg 

1998
 32.0 °C, 8 August, Møn 
 -16.8 °C, 4 February, Hjørring 

1999
 30.6 °C, 12 September, Rømø
 -14.9 °C, 14 February, Grenå 

2000
 32.4 °C, 21 June, Copenhagen
 -16.0 °C, 24 January, Karup
 
2001
 31.2 °C, 16 August, Hammer Odde
 -19.0 °C, 31 December, Roskilde
 
2002
 32.1 °C, 1 August, Rønne
 -12.8 °C, 1 January, Copenhagen
 
2003
 31.9 °C, 8 August, Odense
 -20.5 °C, 7 January, Holbæk
 
2004
 32.2 °C, 10 August, Aalborg
 -16.0 °C, 30 January, Thisted
 
2005
 31.9 °C, 27 June, Odense
 -20.2 °C, 4 March, Copenhagen
 
2006
 35.9 °C, 25 June, Odense
 -17.0 °C, 23 January, Randers
 
2007
 31.4 °C, 11 June, Karup
 -15.0 °C, 24 January, Karup
 
2008
 31.0 °C, 29 July, Esbjerg
 -9.5 °C, 23 March, Karup
 
2009
 34.7 °C, 3 July, Viborg
 -16.2 °C, 19 December, Karup
 
2010
 34.1 °C, 11 July, Hammer Odde 
 -23.0 °C, 22 December, Holbæk
 
2011
 31.5 °C, 27 June, Kolding
 -16.5 °C, 21 February, Aalborg
 
2012 
 31.5 °C, 20 August, Copenhagen
 -23.1 °C, 5 February, Odense
 
2013
 33.3 °C, 2 August, Karup
 -20.6 °C, 16 January, Silkeborg
 
2014 
 31.0 °C, 9 July, Aalborg
 31.0 °C, 3 August, Rønne
 -15.3 °C, 29 December, Roskilde
 
2015
 32.3 °C, 5 July, Holstebro
 -11.5 °C, 6 February, Herning
 
2016
 31.1 °C, 25 August, Karup 
 -15.5 °C, 21 January, Copenhagen
 
2017
 29.0 °C, 27 May, Karup
 -14.0 °C, 16 January, Holbæk
 
2018
 33.6 °C, 27 July, Vejle
 -13.5 °C, 2 March, Holstebro
 
2019
 33.0 °C, 25 July, Karup
 -9.9 °C, 24 January, Copenhagen
 
2020
 32.4 °C, 9 August, Frederiksberg
 -8.2 °C, 25 December, Horsens
 
2021
 30.8 °C, 19 June, Copenhagen
 -19.5 °C, 13 February, Copenhagen & Hillerød
 
2022
 35.9 °C, 20 July, Lolland 
 -18.0 °C, 16 December, Isenvad

Highest and lowest temperatures of every month
This list consists of the highest and lowest temperature of every month. 

January:
 12.6 °C, 1 January 2023, Abed, Lolland 
 -31.2 °C, 8 January 1982, Thisted

February:
 15.8 °C, 24 February 1990, Copenhagen & 26 February 2019, Aarhus 
 -29.0 °C, 8 February 1942, Brande 

March:
 22.2 °C, 18 March 1990, Karup 
 -27.0 °C, 6 March 1888, Holbæk 

April:
 28.6 °C, 27 April 1993, Holbæk 
 -19.0 °C, 3 April 1922, Brønderslev 

May:
 32.8 °C, 27 May 1892, Herning 
 -8.0 °C, 14 May 1900, Silkeborg 

June:
 36.2 °C, 25 June 1976, Taftlund 
 -0.8 °C, 2 June 1936, Klosterhede Plantage 

July:
 35.9 °C, 20 July 2022, Abed, Lolland 
 -1.0 °C, 16 July 1903, Silkeborg 

August:
 36.4 °C, 10 August 1975, Holstebro 
 -1.6 °C, 29 August 1885, Varde 

September:
 35.2 °C, 6 September 1949, Faaborg 
 -5.6 °C, 25 September 1886, Aalborg

October:
 27.0 °C, 1 October 2011, Åbenrå 
 -11.8 °C, 30 October 1880, Torstedlund 

November:
 17.6 °C, 21 November 2009, Tønder 
 -21.4 °C, 30 November 1973, Ringkøbing 

December:
 14.5 °C, 5 December 1953, Nordby, Fanø 
 -25.6 °C, 17 December 1981, Døvling

Highest & lowest temperature of every month in Copenhagen

January:
 11.2°C, 1 January 2022
 -27.6°C, 26 January 1942

February:
 12.8°C, 16 February 2020
 -25.5°C, 21 February 1963

March:
 21.5°C, 18 March 1990 
 -21.0°C, 6 March 1888

April:
 28.0°C, 27 April 1993
 -16.5°C, 3 April 1922 

May:
 32.4°C, 26 May 1892
 -6.6°C, 14 May 1900

June:
 34.8°C, 25 June 1976
 0.4°C, 2 June 1936

July:
 35.6°C, 20 July 2022
 0.1°C, 17 July 1903 

August:
 34.8°C, 10 August 1975 
 0.0°C, 29 August 1885 

September:
 32.4°C, 6 September 1949 
 -2.5°C, 25 September 1886 

October:
 24.4°C, 2 October 2011
 -8.8°C, 30 October 1880 

November:
 17.0°C, 21 November 2009
 -18.4°C, 30 November 1973 

December:
 12.1°C, 5 December 2006
 -22.9°C, 17 December 1981

Top 10 warmest days in Denmark

Records in the 21st Century
Highest temperature: 35.9 °C in Odense, 25 June 2006 and Abed, 20 July 2022.

Lowest temperature: -23.1 °C in Odense, 5 February 2012.

Highest wind gust: 194.4 km/h in Sønderborg, 28 October 2013.

Highest precipitation sum: 135.4 mm in Greater Copenhagen, 2 July 2011.

On 20 July 2022, Copenhagen measured it’s record highest temperature, 35.6 °C.

In the 21st century, Denmark experienced it’s mildest winter, warmest spring, warmest summer & mildest autumn on record. 

 Mildest winter: 2020

 Warmest spring: 2007

 Warmest summer: 2018 

 Mildest autumn: 2006

Highest temperature of every year in Copenhagen, 2000-2022

Lowest temperature of every year in Copenhagen, 2000-2022

Warmest years in Denmark
Denmark’s average temperature is 7.7°C

Highest wind gusts

Precipitation extremes

Month records 

January
 Mildest: 2020 
 Coldest: 1942
 Wettest: 2012
 Driest: 1949
 Windiest: 2012

February 
 Mildest: 1990
 Coldest: 1947
 Wettest: 1988
 Driest: 1996
 Windiest: 2022, 2020 & 1990

March
 Mildest: 1990 & 2007
 Coldest: 1942 
 Wettest: 1915
 Driest: 2022
 Windiest: 2021

April
 Warmest: 2011
 Coldest: 1988
 Wettest: 1900
 Driest: 2014 
 Windiest: 1994

May
 Warmest: 2018
 Coldest: 1902
 Wettest: 2021
 Driest: 2020
 Windiest: 2021

June
 Warmest: 1889
 Mildest: 1923
 Wettest: 2016
 Driest: 1976
 Windiest: 1931

July
 Warmest: 2006
 Mildest: 1979
 Wettest: 1899
 Driest: 2006
 Windiest: 1885

August 
 Warmest: 1997
 Mildest: 1902
 Wettest: 2006 
 Driest: 2022
 Windiest: 2006

September 
 Warmest: 1999, 2006 & 2016
 Mildest: 1877
 Wettest: 2022
 Driest: 2006
 Windiest: 2015

October
 Warmest: 2006
 Coldest: 1905
 Wettest: 1910
 Driest: 2005
 Windiest: 2013

November 
 Mildest: 2006
 Coldest: 1919
 Wettest: 2009
 Driest: 2011
 Windiest: 2009

December 
 Mildest: 2006
 Coldest: 1981
 Wettest: 2015
 Driest: 1924
 Windiest: 2013

References

Works 

Denmark-related lists
Environment of Denmark
Denmark